Moltonville (also Moultonville) is an unincorporated community in Sampson County, North Carolina, United States.

Notes

Unincorporated communities in Sampson County, North Carolina
Unincorporated communities in North Carolina